Ali ibn Muhammad ibn Habib (–1058), commonly known by the nisba al-Mawardi, was a Muslim scholar, jurist and philosopher 

Al-Mawardi was born and raised in Basra where he studied Islamic jurisprudence from jurist Abu al-Wahid. He later settled in Baghdad to learn advanced Islamic studies under tutelage of Abd al-Hamid. After finishing studies, al-Mawardi was appointed  ("supreme judge") of the Abbasid Caliphate. He maintained close relations with caliphs al-Qadir and al-Qa'im and sought to restore Muslim unity by negotiating with the Buyid emirs and Seljuk sultans.

Biography 
Some authors make the claim that his family was Kurdish, a claim which is unsubstantiated.

Among many of his various other works he is also credited with the creation of darura, a doctrine of necessity. Al-Mawardi died at an old age in Baghdad on 30 Rabi'a 450/27, May 1058.

Works 
 al-Ahkam al-Sultaniyya w'al-Wilayat al-Diniyya (The Ordinances of Government)
 Qanun al-Wazarah (Laws regarding the Ministers)
 Kitab Nasihat al-Mulk (The Book of Sincere Advice to Rulers)
 Kitab Aadab al-Dunya w'al-Din (The Ethics of Religion and of this World)
 Personas of the Prophethood
 al-Nukat wa’l-ʿuyūn fī tafsīr al-Qurʾān popularly Tafsir al-Mawardi

Jurisprudence 
According to Wafaa H. Wahaba, "For al-Mawardi the caliphate symbolized an entire politico-religious system that regulates the lives of men in a Muslim community to the smallest detail. Hence the emphasis in [The Ordinances] placed on the qualifications, power and duties pertinent to [a given office of government]... This approach to the matter would explain the working arrangement finally reached by the Buyids and the Abbasid caliphs, later followed also by the more efficient Seljuqs, whereby the military held actual power while recognizing the Caliph as the supreme head of government and receiving from him, in turn, recognition of their mundane authority."

Al-Mawardi postulated in his book al-Ahkam al-Sultania w'al-Wilayat al-Diniyya, That according to Shafiite ruling, an unclaimed land property could be freely given by Islamic government to particular individual whom they saw can cultivate and process the land plot so it can became productive land. Mawardi based this ruling on the case when Muhammad given 'Iqta''(taxable land) plot for Zubayr ibn al-Awwam who designed the property for horse riding training ground. This view also shared by 20th century Shafiite scholar, Wahbah al-Zuhayli, who highlighted that Zubayr ownership were legal per ruling of Shafii.

See also
Islamic scholars
 Nasîhatnâme

Appendix

References

Bibliography

External links
 ABU AL-HASAN AL-MAWARDI
 Review of al-Ahkam as-Sultanniyah
 
  Kitab adab al-dunya wa-al-din, 1882, by Mward, Al ibn Muammad, 974?-1058
 

972 births
1058 deaths
11th-century jurists

11th-century people from the Abbasid Caliphate

Islamic mirrors for princes

People from Basra

Political philosophy in medieval Islam

Shafi'is

Scholars from the Abbasid Caliphate